Sekuwa is meat roasted in a natural wood fire in a traditional Nepalese country style. While the meat is still raw, it is mixed with natural herbs and spices and other ingredients. Sekuwa can be made with pork, lamb, goat or chicken, or a mixture. Sekuwa is very popular in Nepal, especially in Dharan and Kathmandu. Dharan and Tarahara, small towns in the Sunsari District of Koshi State in Eastern Nepal, could be called the sekuwa capitals of Nepal.

References

External links
Sekuwa recipe
Sekuwa in Kathmandu
 Sekuwa Restaurants in Kathmandu

Nepalese cuisine